North Korea participated at the 2018 Asian Para Games which was held in Jakarta, Indonesia from 6 to 13 October 2018. The delegation consisted of seven athletes who participated in table tennis, swimming and para athletics.

See also
 North Korea at the 2018 Asian Games

References

Nations at the 2018 Asian Para Games
2018 in North Korean sport